Jack Cameron may refer to:

Jack Cameron (actor)
Jack Cameron (baseball)
Jack Cameron (ice hockey)
Jack Cameron (footballer, died 1916), Scottish footballer for Huddersfield Town
Jack Cameron (footballer, born 1931), Scottish footballer for Dumbarton and Hartlepools
Jock Cameron (footballer), Scottish international footballer and manager

See also
John Cameron (disambiguation)